Kent Road Village is a historic apartment complex and national historic district located in Richmond, Virginia.  The complex was built in 1942–1943, and consists of 11 Colonial Revival style brick buildings.  They are two stories in height and include three different exterior treatments.  The complex was designed by Richmond architect E. Tucker Carlton and built under the auspices of the Federal Housing Administration.

It was listed on the National Register of Historic Places in 2011.

References

Residential buildings on the National Register of Historic Places in Virginia
Historic districts on the National Register of Historic Places in Virginia
Colonial Revival architecture in Virginia
Residential buildings completed in 1943
Buildings and structures in Richmond, Virginia
National Register of Historic Places in Richmond, Virginia